Sui Jianshuang (born February 1, 1989, in Shenyang, Liaoning) is a Chinese rhythmic gymnast. She won the gold medal at the 2002 Asian Games in the group event.

She represented China at the 2008 Summer Olympics and won a silver medal in the group competition.

References
 

1989 births
Living people
Chinese rhythmic gymnasts
Gymnasts at the 2008 Summer Olympics
Olympic gymnasts of China
Olympic silver medalists for China
Sportspeople from Shenyang
Olympic medalists in gymnastics
Gymnasts from Liaoning
Medalists at the 2008 Summer Olympics
21st-century Chinese women